Richard Joseph Yelvington Jr. (July 27, 1928 – February 24, 2013) was an American football offensive lineman. He played six seasons for the New York Giants. Yelvington played college football at Georgia, and served one year with the United States Army during the Korean War before starting his NFL career.

References 

1928 births
2013 deaths
American football offensive tackles
Georgia Bulldogs football players
New York Giants players
United States Army personnel of the Korean War
People from Mims, Florida
Players of American football from Florida